Soma Games is an American video game developer based in Newberg, Oregon. Founded in 2005 by Chris Skaggs, Rande Bruhn, and John Bergquist, Soma originally produced mobile games such as G and Windup Robots, and beginning in 2018, licensed games based on the Redwall book series. Soma Games emphasizes its Christian company culture and often describes itself as a Christian video game company that does not make video games specifically about Christianity.

History 
Chris Skaggs, a web developer from Newberg, Oregon, stated that he was inspired to found Soma Games after registering to attend the Christian Game Developers Conference in 2005 despite no knowledge of the Christian video game industry sector. Shortly after his registration, the conference coordinator asked prospective attendees if anyone wanted to appear in a televised interview in Boston, which Skaggs accepted.

The two other founding members of Soma Games, Rande Bruhn, and John Bergquist began mentoring and helping Skaggs in 2005 after meeting him at a Christian retreat event called Bootcamp NW. It was during this time that Soma developed the ideas for its first games, GRoG, Dark Glass, and The Race. These ideas were put on hiatus for a time due to external circumstances in Skaggs' life, but in 2008 Skaggs and his colleagues began brainstorming ideas again. In October 2008 John Bergquist began volunteering more actively, helping Skaggs write down ideas and establish Soma as an actual company (though due to financial constraints he was not hired as an official employee until 2011), and Rande Bruhn followed as an official business partner two months later. In December 2008, Soma Games received funding for the first time and began coding its first projects.

Arc series 
Entering 2009, Soma consisted of four employees (with three additional remote "contractors" giving their time both paid and unpaid.) Throughout its earliest years, Soma Games focused on fleshing out their three-game concepts as well as gaining publicity and funding. They soon developed a fourth game concept, this being for a full series they decided to call "Arc." The team decided that the Arc series would consist of three small iPhone games or "episodes" that would act as a prologue for a larger console game eponymously titled Arc. As a way to obtain early funding from fans, Soma released a computer wallpaper featuring concept art from their Dark Glass game that players could buy with the promise that they could later "redeem" this wallpaper for a free copy of Arc when it was released. In March 2009, the company began selling merchandise through CafePress.com.

The first game in the Arc series, G, was announced on February 11, 2009. It entered beta in March and was submitted to the Apple App Store in April, eventually releasing on April 25, 2009. The app received very positive reviews upon launch, with reviewers praising its visuals, storyline, art, and voice-acting but also criticizing some technical bugs present in the initial build and the game's tendency to become boring quickly. Software updates were continued to be put out for G throughout the rest of the year.

On June 17, 2009, Soma revealed plans for the sequel to G, titled F, in an interview with the German app review site pressHOME. In the same way that the name "G" stood for its main gameplay mechanic of "Gravity," "F" was said to refer to the sequel's main gameplay mechanic of "Force." Screenshots were released to news outlets a couple of months later and the title was revealed to be a 3D game rather than following the 2D approach of its predecessor. Eventually it was also revealed that the third mobile game preceding the series' finale of Arc would be titled "E."

In 2009, the staff of Soma Games were asked to speak at the Christian Game Developers Conference in Portland, Oregon and have been asked to be recurring speakers nearly every year since. In 2009, G won the "Best iPhone Game" award at the conference. In October 2009 Soma partnered with the band Skillet to give away free iPod Touches with copies of G on them.

Relationship with Intel 
In December 2009, Soma began partnering with Intel Corporation to be one of the initial developers for their upcoming AppUp app store. A Flash port of G was developed by the team in approximately two and a half weeks, and launched as one of 22 initial games on the AppUp platform. In a series of blog posts, Chris Skaggs conveyed his excitement to be one of the original app developers on an app store that would be pre-installed on certain computers. With the release of their 2.0 update for G in March 2010, Soma ran a contest for players to win a then-unreleased iPad by reaching the highest score in G. G was ported to the BlackBerry PlayBook in April 2011 to be among the device's launch catalog, and a Steam port for the game was also considered but ultimately cancelled.

In order to develop the PC port for G, the development of F was put on hold, but was picked up again the next year. Gameplay footage of F was released in October 2010 featuring a 3D space environment running on the Unity engine, and the game was given the subtitle "The Storm Riders." Actress and video game journalist Lisa Foiles was also announced to be working on the game's story as a writer, and Lisa was cited as responsible for adding cutscenes to the game's script. However, despite releasing many pieces of concept art, teasers, and gameplay footage, the release date for F: The Storm Riders was continually pushed back, and the release for the game (as well as its two sequels) was eventually put on an indefinite hiatus.

Wind Up Robots and continuing Arc
At the same time as development on F was taking place, Soma Games was also reportedly working on another of their initial game ideas, GRoG, which stood for "that Giant Robot Game you have." During development, work on the game evolved into working on a prequel, and on May 31, 2011 this prequel was announced to be released later in the year under the title "Wind Up Robots." Wind Up Robots missed its July launched date and eventually was released on December 14, 2011 for the Intel AppUp, iOS and Amazon Kindle Fire app stores. The game received generally positive reveiews, with some sources commenting favorably upon its originality and robot customization features but critiquing its tutorial and imprecise touch control movement. In 2012 Soma participated in the Intel Ultimate Coder: Ultrabook Challenge to use the same assets from Wind Up Robots to make a spinoff game called Wind Up Football in six weeks. Wind Up Football was added as a game mode in an update to the original Wind Up Robots game at first, but was later released to appstores as a standalone game.

Going into 2012, during one of their weekly update YouTube videos, Soma announced that they planned to continue the Arc and GRoG storylines that they had developed. In order to remind players of the Arc storyline, Soma announced that they were remaking the original G: Into the Rain for X and X as G Prime.

Redwall series 
In 2011, an associate had called Soma's founder Chris Skaggs to inform him that he had acquired the master license to the Redwall series from the author of the books, Brian Jacques (who had previously been very guarded about sharing the license with anyone). Chris and his associate entered into talks of developing a small mobile game for the Redwall brand, as mobile gaming was where the Soma team had the most experience. In 2013, a Kickstarter was set up to fund the Redwall game, and in 2018 the game was released on Steam for Mac and PC.

Company culture 
The management and staff of Soma Games are vocal Christians, and are very open about their religious affiliation. However, while the company is based on Christian values, they have often clearly expressed that they do not create "Christian video games", which are explicitly based on Christian stories and content. Soma Games have described themselves as being the "C. S. Lewis of video games", taking inspiration from the author by making video games with Christian values and themes, but that are not specifically using Christian stories and tropes. In its early days, Soma had trouble funding the development and distribution of its games. According to the company, they prefer to try to deliver polished content rather than manufacturing its earliest products on a minimal budget, a problem they cited as a point of failure for many startup Christian video game developers.

The company founder, Chris Skaggs, has mentioned many times that he values artistic beauty and a good story in games over impressive new gameplay. He has also many times mentioned his company's emphasis on commanding rest, contrary to the typical expectation of video game companies to implement "crunch time".

Code-Monkeys 
Soma Games also ran a sister brand called "Code-Monkeys" in which their same employees would do "work-for-hire" developing games and software that was not their own intellectual property. This was done to provide income in-between the release of their larger projects published under Soma Games. 

In June 2011, the Soma Games developers released the game Bok Choy Boy for the Intel AppUp platform and iOS under the name of their sister brand, Code-Monkeys. This game was based around the Chinese Bok Choy Boy toy line.

Games

As Soma Games

As Code-Monkeys

References

External links 
 

2005 establishments in Oregon
Privately held companies based in Oregon
Video game companies established in 2005
Video game companies of the United States
Video game development companies